André Tison (26 February 1885 – 25 December 1963) was a French track and field athlete who competed at the 1906, 1908, 1912 and 1920 Summer Olympics.

In 1906 he finished fourth in the shot put, fifth in the freestyle discus throw, and 22nd in the standing long jump competition. Two years later he placed eighth in the discus throw, while his result in the shot put contest is unknown. In 1912 he was ninth in the shot put and 30th in the discus throw, and in 1920 he finished eleventh in the discus throw.

Tison was the French champion in the shot put (1905, 1907, 1908, 1910, 1911, 1913, and 1914) and discus throw (1907–1914 and 1920); he finished second in the shot put (1909, 1912, 1919, and 1920) and javelin throw (1913) and third in discus throw (1919). He held national records in the shot put (1905: 12.46 m, 1907: 12.75 m, 1908: 12.81 m, 1909: 13.145 m) and discus throw (1908: 39.13 m, 1909: 41.25 m, 1913: 41.58 m).

References

1885 births
1963 deaths
French male shot putters
French male discus throwers
French male long jumpers
Olympic athletes of France
Athletes (track and field) at the 1906 Intercalated Games
Athletes (track and field) at the 1908 Summer Olympics
Athletes (track and field) at the 1912 Summer Olympics
Athletes (track and field) at the 1920 Summer Olympics
19th-century French people
20th-century French people